The Arte para aprender la lengua mexicana is a grammar of the Nahuatl language in Spanish by Andrés de Olmos. It was written in Mexico in 1547, but remained in manuscript form until 1875, when it was published in Paris by Rémi Siméon under the title Grammaire de la langue nahuatl ou mexicaine. Olmos' Arte is the earliest known Nahuatl grammar.

As with usual Nahuatl orthography, Olmos did not write glottal stops (saltillos), or distinguish vowel length.

Notes

References

External links
Digital reproduction of Grammaire de la langue nahuatl ou mexicaine 

1547 books
1875 non-fiction books
Nahuatl dictionaries and grammars